Dear Science is the third studio album by the band TV on the Radio. It was released on September 16, 2008, digitally through Touch and Go Records, with the physical release coming a week later through Interscope Records and DGC Records in North America and 4AD elsewhere.

As of 2012, sales in the United States have exceeded 203,000 copies, according to Nielsen SoundScan. In 2009. It was awarded a gold certification from the Independent Music Companies Association, which indicated sales of at least 100,000 copies throughout Europe.

History
Dear Science was recorded in 2008 at the Stay Gold studio in Brooklyn, New York. Musically, the album has been described as indie rock, art rock, funk, soul, and post-punk. Kyp Malone said that the album's title came from "a note that Dave [Sitek] wrote in the studio that said,
"Dear Science, please start solving problems and curing diseases or shut the fuck up."

Despite the marketed release date of September 22–23, the album was available for download on the U.S. iTunes Store on September 16, 2008. The vinyl LP also comes with a free MP3 download coupon. Dear Science received near unanimous acclaim from critics and charted worldwide. In promotion of the album, TV on the Radio was interviewed on the February 9, 2009 episode of The Colbert Report, "Dancing Choose" was performed to end the show. The rock band Phish began covering "Golden Age" in 2009.

Critical reception

Dear Science received rave reviews from critics. At Metacritic, which assigns a normalized rating out of 100 to reviews from mainstream critics, the album received an average score of 88, which indicates "universal acclaim", based on 40 reviews. It was named the best album of 2008 by Rolling Stone, The Guardian, Spin, MTV, Entertainment Weekly, the Pitchforks readers poll, and the Village Voice.

Pitchfork placed Dear Science at number 140 on their list of top 200 albums of the 2000s, and 6th on their "50 Best Albums of 2008" list. Rolling Stone named it the 48th best album of the decade.  The album was also included in the book 1001 Albums You Must Hear Before You Die.

Remix EP
In early 2009, a remix EP was announced for release on February 17, although it was delayed until April 14. Read Silence was released exclusively through iTunes and featured remixes of "Shout Me Out", "Red Dress", and "Stork & Owl" by Gang Gang Dance, Jneiro Jarel, and Glitch Mob.

Track listing

Personnel
Personnel adapted from album liner notes.

Band
 Tunde Adebimpe – vocals
 Kyp Malone – vocals, guitars, bass guitar, synths, string arrangements
 David Andrew Sitek – programming, guitars, samples, bass, synths, horn arrangements
 Gerard A Smith – bass, organ, synths, samples, Rhodes
 Jaleel Bunton – drums, guitars, rhodes, organ, synth, bass, programming, string arrangements

Production
David Andrew Sitek – production; mixing
Dan Huron – engineering
Chris Coady – additional engineering
Chris Moore – additional engineering
Matty Green – mixing
Mark Stent – additional mixing
Steve Fallone – mastering

Design
Roe Etheridge – photography

Additional musicians
Katrina Ford – vocals, backing vocals
Eleanore Everdell – vocals
David Bergander – drums
Yoshi Takamasa – shaker, claves, congas, bells, percussion
Stuart D. Bogie – sax, horn arrangements, tenor sax
Colin Stetson – sax, baritone sax
Matana Roberts – alto sax, clarinet
Leah Paul – horns
Eric Biondo – trumpet
Aaron Johnson – trombone
Martin Perna – saxophones, flutes
Claudia Chopek – violin, string arrangements
Janis Shen – violin, string arrangements
Perry Serpa – additional string arrangements
Lara Hicks – viola
Eleanor Norton – cello

Charts

References

2008 albums
TV on the Radio albums
Interscope Records albums
DGC Records albums
4AD albums
Albums produced by Dave Sitek